Nicolás Vuyovich (Orán, Salta, June 29, 1981 – Córdoba, Argentina, 8 May 2005) was a sportscar driver from Argentina.

Vuyovich died the same day he clinched his first win in TC2000 series at the wheel of Toyota Corolla. He was victim of a plane crash accident in Córdoba (when returning from San Juan) together with his team manager and other passengers.

External links
About the accident (Clarin.com) [in Spanish]
Dossier at TC2000.com.ar [in Spanish]

1981 births
2005 deaths
Argentine people of Montenegrin descent
Argentine racing drivers
Sportspeople from Salta Province
TC 2000 Championship drivers
Victims of aviation accidents or incidents in Argentina
Victims of aviation accidents or incidents in 2005